François Perez (died 20 September 1728) served as the Apostolic Vicar of Cochin (1687–1728).

Biography
François Perez was born in Siam and ordained a priest in 1668. On 5 February 1687 Pope Innocent XI appointed him the Apostolic Vicar of Cochin and Titular Bishop of Bugia. On 29 July 1691 he was consecrated bishop by Louis Laneau, Apostolic Vicar of Siam. he died on 20 September 1728.

While bishop, he was the principal consecrator of Alexandre de Alexandris, Titular Bishop of Nabala (1726) and coadjutor Apostolic Vicar of Cochin.

References

1728 deaths
Paris Foreign Missions Society missionaries
17th-century Roman Catholic bishops in Vietnam
18th-century Roman Catholic bishops in Vietnam
French Roman Catholic missionaries
French Roman Catholic bishops in Asia
Bishops appointed by Pope Innocent XI
Roman Catholic missionaries in Vietnam
Roman Catholic missionaries in Thailand
French expatriates in Vietnam
French expatriates in Thailand